Auqakuh Vallis is an ancient river valley in the Syrtis Major quadrangle on Mars, located at 
30.4° north latitude and 299.9° west longitude.  It is 312 km long, and is named for the word for 'Mars' in Quechua (Inca).

Buttes 
Many places on Mars have buttes that are similar to buttes on Earth, such as the famous ones in Monument Valley, Utah.  Buttes are formed when most of a layer(s) of rocks are removed from an area.  Buttes usually have a hard, erosion-resistant cap rock on the top.  The cap rock causes the top of a butte to be flat.  An example of a butte in the Syrtis Major quadrangle is shown in a picture on this page.

References 

Valleys and canyons on Mars
Syrtis Major quadrangle